is a railway station on the Iiyama Line in the village of Sakae, Shimominochi District, Nagano Prefecture, Japan, operated by East Japan Railway Company (JR East).

Lines
Hirataki Station is served by the Iiyama Line, and is 44.7 kilometers from the starting point of the line at Toyono Station.

Station layout
The station consists of one side platform serving a single bi-directional platform. The station is staffed.

History
Hirataki Station opened on 16 October 1931.  With the privatization of Japanese National Railways (JNR) on 1 April 1987, the station came under the control of JR East. The station building was rebuilt in 2010.

Passenger statistics
In fiscal 2020, the station was used by an average of 3 passengers daily (boarding passengers only).

Surrounding area
Chikuma River
Hirataki Post Office

See also
 List of railway stations in Japan

References

External links

 JR East station information 

Railway stations in Nagano Prefecture
Iiyama Line
Railway stations in Japan opened in 1931
Sakae, Nagano